How Could You, Caroline? is a 1918 American silent comedy-drama film directed by Frederick A. Thomson, with a screenplay by Agnes Christine Johnston. It stars Bessie Love, James W. Morrison, and Dudley Hawley.

The film is presumed lost.

Plot 
Caroline (Love), a student at a boarding school, attends the wedding of her sister Ethel (Earle), where handsome taxi driver Reginald (Hawley) is to be her date. Reginald's taxi breaks down while giving Caroline a ride, and Caroline is late to the wedding. As punishment, she is sent to her room, but she escapes and decides to elope with Reginald, only to discover that he is married.

Later, Caroline is engaged to Bob (Morrison). Caroline disguises herself as a masked dancer at his bachelor party to see whether he truly loves her. Bob marries the masked dancer. Caroline reveals her identity, which Bob already had realized, and they are happy together.

Cast 
 Bessie Love as Caroline Rodgers
 James W. Morrison as Bob Worth
 Dudley Hawley as Reginald Van Allen
 Henry Hallam as Mr. Rodgers
 Edna Earle as Ethel Rodgers
 Amelia Summerville as Mrs. Rodgers

Reception 
A contemporaneous review called the plot "rather frail and considerably padded at the end", but praised the performances of Love and Hawley. Love's wardrobe was cited as fashionable.

Screenwriter Agnes Christine Johnston's depiction of the female lead character has been praised as efficiently creating complex female identities.

References

External links 

 
 
 

1918 comedy-drama films
1918 lost films
1918 films
American black-and-white films
1910s English-language films
American silent feature films
Films based on short fiction
Lost American films
Lost comedy-drama films
Pathé Exchange films
Films directed by Frederick A. Thomson
1910s American films
Silent American comedy-drama films